The Military District of Ödenburg was one of the administrative units of the Habsburg Kingdom of Hungary from 1850 to 1860. The seat of the district was Ödenburg (Sopron). It included parts of present-day Hungary, Austria, Croatia, and Slovenia.

See also
Administrative divisions of the Kingdom of Hungary

External links
Map
Map

1850 establishments in Hungary
Military units and formations disestablished in 1860
Military history of Hungary
Sopron
1850s establishments in the Austrian Empire
Geographic history of Croatia
Modern history of Slovenia